The Women's 100 metres Hurdles at the 1988 Summer Olympics in Seoul, South Korea had an entry list of 37 competitors, with five qualifying heats (37 runners), three second-rounds (24) and two semifinals (16) before the final (8) took place on Friday September 30, 1988.

Medalists

Records
These were the standing World and Olympic records (in seconds) prior to the 1988 Summer Olympics.

The following Olympic records were set during this competition.

Results

Final
Wind +0.2

Semifinals
Held on Friday 1988-09-30
Heat 1Wind +0.5

Heat 2Wind +0.5

Quarterfinals
First 4 of each heat (Q) and next 4 fastest (q) qualified for the semifinals.

Wind: Heat 1 +1.3, Heat 2 +0.2, Heat 3 +1.0

Heats
First 4 of each heat (Q) and next 4 fastest (q) qualified for the quarterfinals.

Wind: Heat 1 -0.3, Heat 2 +0.1, Heat 3 +0.5, Heat 4 +1.4, Heat 5 +0.8

See also
 1986 European World Championships 100m Hurdles (Stuttgart)
 1987 Women's World Championships 100m Hurdles (Rome)
 1990 European World Championships 100m Hurdles (Split)
 1991 Women's World Championships 100m Hurdles (Tokyo)
 1992 Women's Olympic 100m Hurdles (Barcelona)

References

External links
  Official Report

 1
Sprint hurdles at the Olympics
1988 in women's athletics
Women's events at the 1988 Summer Olympics